The Somerset Downtown Commercial District in Somerset, Kentucky, which includes 108-236 and 201-223 E. Mt. Vernon St., is a  historic district which was listed on the National Register of Historic Places in 1982.  The district included 15 contributing buildings.

It was asserted to be "the last remaining concentration of late 19th and early 20th century commercial buildings in
south central Kentucky" and "the largest such district in Pulaski County."

References

Historic districts on the National Register of Historic Places in Kentucky
Victorian architecture in Kentucky
Commercial buildings completed in 1880
National Register of Historic Places in Pulaski County, Kentucky
Commercial buildings on the National Register of Historic Places in Kentucky
Somerset, Kentucky